For the Summer Olympics, there are a total of 66 venues starting with the letter 'O'.

References

 List O